Eugoa inconspicua is a moth of the family Erebidae first described by Francis Walker in 1863. It is found on Borneo. The habitat consists of various lowland areas, including alluvial forests, wet heath forests and swamp forests.

References

inconspicua
Moths described in 1863